Doriprismatica paladentata is a species of sea slug, a dorid nudibranch, a shell-less marine gastropod mollusk in the family Chromodorididae.

Distribution 
This species is found only in Papua New Guinea and Vanuatu in the Western Pacific Ocean.

References

Chromodorididae
Gastropods described in 1986